"Stay" is a song written by Bob Khozouri and Mark Stevens, originally recorded by American singer Glenn Jones and released in 1990. It reached number six on the US Billboard Hot Black Singles chart. The song became a worldwide hit for British girl group Eternal in 1993 and 1994.

Charts

Eternal version

Three years after the first recording, "Stay" served as the debut single of British girl group Eternal. It released on September 20, 1993, as the lead single from their first album, Always & Forever (1993). The single entered the UK Singles Chart at number 16 on September 26, 1993, eventually peaking at number four on October 17, 1993. The single was also a hit on the US Billboard Hot 100, peaking at number 19 on March 12, 1994 and selling over 220,000 copies in the US.

Critical reception
Jon O'Brien from AllMusic viewed the song as an example of "perfect R&B-infused pop". Larry Flick from Billboard described it as a "shuffling, hip-hop-flavored pop ditty". He added that "sweet lead vocals and pillowy backing harmonies have enough of a soulful edge to hold up against heavy hitting US counterparts SWV and Xscape. Tune is a simple love song, laced with a memorable melody and a fun, sing-along chorus. Expect multiformat acceptance within moments." Bill Speed and John Martinucci from the Gavin Report called the groove "sexy", "confident" and "a jam!". Pan-European magazine Music & Media declared the group as the British answer to En Vogue, adding that "this uptempo tune certainly has the necessary staying power." 

Marc Stingl, music director of Radio Gong/Nuremberg received fabulous feedback from his listeners after he made it powerplay. He said, "Our so-called 'hit hammer' is played 36 times a week. According to our rules we never tell what it is, because we want enthusiasts to phone in. Well, it's an absolutely sensational song, a sure-to-be European hit, so our phones were red hot." Alan Jones from Music Week deemed it a "powerful" remake, adding that the girls "have excellent voices". John Kilgo from The Network Forty noted that a "contagious groove, spiced with vintage harmonies, makes this masterpiece incredibly hip". Steven Wells from NME stated that it "pack a surprising bite", calling it "dead classy". A reviewer from People Magazine described the song as "lighter-than-air". Tom Doyle from Smash Hits gave "Stay" four out of five, declaring it as "a fine soul thing with cooing harmonies, pumping beat and voluptuous lyrics, with the singer imploring her boyfriend not to dump her but return to her boudoir instead. Pretty damn catchy it is too. A surefire Top 10 hit."

Music video
The accompanying music video for "Stay" was filmed in New York City, directed by German director Marcus Nispel, and features the girls executing choreographed dance moves against colorful backdrops. The video became a staple on the American cable network BET's Video Soul in early 1994.

Track listings

 UK 7-inch and cassette single, US cassette single
 "Stay" – 3:50
 "Don't Say Goodbye" – 4:16

 UK 12-inch single
A1. "Stay" (12-inch mix) – 4:51
A2. "Stay" (The Fly mix) – 4:10
B1. "Stay" (West End D'Rhythm mix) – 7:26
B2. "Stay" (West End Clapapella mix) – 4:27

 UK and Australian CD single
 "Stay" (7-inch mix) – 3:50
 "Stay" (12-inch mix) – 4:51
 "Stay" (original mix) – 5:00
 "Don't Say Goodbye" – 4:16

 US and Canadian CD single
 "Stay" – 3:50
 "Stay" (extended mix radio edit) – 3:43
 "Stay" (extended mix) – 4:53
 "Stay" (club mix) – 4:36
 "Stay" (Eternal mix) – 4:36

 US 12-inch single
A1. "Stay" (extended mix) – 4:53
A2. "Stay" (extended instrumental) – 6:42
A3. "Stay" (album version) – 3:50
B1. "Stay" (club mix) – 4:36
B2. "Stay" (Eternal mix) – 4:36
B3. "Stay" (Percapella mix) – 4:51

 Japanese mini-CD single
 "Stay" (7-inch version)
 "Stay" (extended version radio edit)

 Dutch CD single (1995)
 "Stay" (7-inch mix) – 4:00
 "Stay" (Teddy Riley Eternal mix) – 6:20
 "Stay" (Teddy Riley remix) – 6:44
 "Stay" (West End Clapapella mix) – 4:26
 "Stay" (West End D'Moodier mix) – 8:23

Credits and personnel
Credits are lifted from the Always & Forever album booklet.

Studio
 Recorded at Sarm Studios (London, England)

Personnel
 Mark Stevens – writing
 Bobby Khozouri – writing
 Nigel Lowis – all instruments, production
 Steve Jervier – additional production and remix
 Peter Craigie – mix engineering
 Ren Swan – engineering

Charts and sales

Weekly charts

Year-end charts

Certifications and sales

References

1990 singles
1990 songs
1993 debut singles
EMI Records singles
Eternal (band) songs
First Avenue Records singles
Glenn Jones songs
Jive Records singles
Music videos directed by Marcus Nispel
New jack swing songs